Sonai Rupai Wildlife Sanctuary is a protected area located in the state of Assam in India. This wildlife sanctuary covers 175 km2. It is located along the foothills of the Great Himalayan Range. The area was declared as a sanctuary in 1998. It is located 52 km from Tezpur town and 193 km away from Guwahati. Four rivers flow through the sanctuary: Gabharu, Gelgeli, Sonai and Rupai.

Biodiversity
Mammals: tiger, lesser cats, elephant, gaur, wild boar, pygmy hog, swamp deer and barking deer.

Birds: white winged wood duck, hornbill, pelican, and various migratory birds.

Reptiles: python, Russell's viper.

See also
 Kameng Elephant Reserve

References

External links
Sonai Rupai Wildlife Sanctuary at assaminfo.com.
Sonai Rupai Wildlife Sanctuary at Tour Travel World.com

Brahmaputra Valley semi-evergreen forests
Wildlife sanctuaries in Assam
Sonitpur district
Protected areas established in 1998
1998 establishments in Assam